Natalie Fort is a news anchor and a Ghanaian television personality.

Life and career 
Fort was born on 24 July 1995  and attended Ghana International School, Merton International School, the Royal Academy of Music and Accra Film School. She began her career as a fashion model and represented Ghana in 2011 at the Miss Princess World Competition in Czech Republic. She is the founder of Fort Model Management and Fort Foundation. She was awarded by the United Nations with the Gold Star Order of the Companion Honour and also accorded the Excellent Personality Merit Award in 2017.

References 

Living people
Ghanaian journalists
1995 births
Ghanaian women journalists